Mica Insulator Company is a historic daylight factory complex located at Schenectady, Schenectady County, New York. The complex consists of the four-story Micanite Works built in 1915 and the adjacent three-story Lamicoid Building built in 1946. The two buildings are connected by a third floor exterior walkway.  The Micanite Works is of reinforced concrete construction and the Lamicoid Building is a steel frame building with brick curtain walls.  Both features large multi-paned windows and open floor plans.

It was added to the National Register of Historic Places in 2015.

References

Industrial buildings and structures on the National Register of Historic Places in New York (state)
Industrial buildings completed in 1915
Industrial buildings completed in 1946
Buildings and structures in Schenectady, New York
National Register of Historic Places in Schenectady County, New York